Superstars V8 Racing is a car racing video game based on the 2008 season of the Italy-based Superstars Series and available for the arcade on 17 April 2009 and ported to Xbox 360, PlayStation 3 and Windows on 26 June 2009. It is the first car racing game from developer Milestone since 2006's Evolution GT. A sequel, Superstars V8 Next Challenge, was released in 2010.

2009 video games
Arcade video games
PlayStation 3 games
PlayStation Network games
Racing simulators
Video games developed in Italy
Windows games
Xbox 360 games
Milestone srl games
Black Bean Games games
Codemasters games
Multiplayer and single-player video games